Nityananda (born circa 1474) was the primary religious figure within the Gaudiya Vaishnava tradition of Hinduism.

The Indian name Nityananda (eternal + , bliss) may also refer to:

Bhagawan Nityananda (1897–1961), an Indian guru from Maharashtra
Nityanand Swami (Paramhansa) (1754–1850), a Hindu saint
Nityanand Swami (politician) (1927–2012), an Indian politician and the first chief minister of the Indian state Uttaranchal
Nityananda Mohapatra (1912–2012), an Indian politician, poet and journalist from Orissa
Nityananda Palit (1923–1990), an Indian playwright, actor and director
Nitya Anand (born 1925), an Indian scientist
Nithyananda (born 1978), an Indian guru from Tamil Nadu